Robert Samuel Decosta Higgins MD, MSHA is an American surgeon known for his expertise in heart–lung transplants.  He is president, Brigham and Women's Hospital; Executive Vice President, Mass General Brigham.

Robert S.D. Higgins, MD, MSHA, serves as president of Brigham and Women's Hospital (BWH) and executive vice president at Mass General Brigham, roles he assumed in December 2021.

As president, Higgins is responsible for the vitality and success of the clinical, academic and educational mission of the Brigham in support of patients locally and across the globe. As executive vice president, he plays an active leadership role within the Mass General Brigham system, setting and guiding strategy, priorities, and performance.

A distinguished academic and clinical physician with a long track record of collaborative leadership, Higgins joined the Brigham from Johns Hopkins Hospital, where he served as Director of the Department of Surgery and Surgeon-in-Chief, as well as the William Stewart Halsted Professor of Surgery at Johns Hopkins School of Medicine. He is the first African-American Director of the Department of Surgery at Johns Hopkins.

Higgins is a proven innovator with the ability to manage complex, multidisciplinary services at world-class organizations, and a passionate advocate for research with a life-long commitment to training the next generation of exceptional people in healthcare. Widely regarded as a leading authority in heart and lung transplantation, adult and pediatric cardiac surgery and mechanical circulatory support, Higgins is a pioneer with remarkable clinical and academic accomplishments.

Prior to Hopkins, Higgins served as Department of Surgery Chair and Director of the Comprehensive Transplant Center at The Ohio State University Medical Center from 2010 to 2015. He has served in numerous national professional leadership roles, including the President of the Society of Thoracic Surgeons (2019-2020), President of the United Network for Organ Sharing (2009-2010), President of the Society of Black Academic Surgeons (2008-2009), and President of the American College of Surgeons Society of Surgical Chairs (2019-2020) and as a member of the Board of Directors of the American Board of Thoracic Surgery. Most recently, he was elected to the Johns Hopkins School of Medicine Alpha Omega Alpha chapter and was awarded the Fellowship Ad Hominem of the Royal College of Surgeons of Edinburgh (RCSEd). He has authored more than 200 scientific articles and book chapters.

Higgins earned his bachelor's degree from Dartmouth College and medical degree from Yale School of Medicine. He completed his residency in general surgery and served as chief resident at the University Hospitals of Pittsburgh. He was a Winchester Scholar and fellow in cardiothoracic surgery at the Yale School of Medicine. He earned a master's degree in health services administration at Virginia Commonwealth University.

Higgins has also served as a senior registrar in transplantation at the renowned Papworth Hospital, the United Kingdom's largest cardiothoracic surgical program and its main heart-lung transplant center. He also served as a Major in the United States Army Reserve Medical Corps for 13 years and while doing so, supported the Richmond Veterans Administration transplantation program.

Higgins is a founding board member of the International Center for Genetic Disease (iCGD) at Brigham and Women's Hospital, Harvard Medical School, which focuses on the analysis of patients and healthy subjects from different parts of the world for genetics research into human disease and health.

References
 https://www.brighamandwomens.org/about-bwh/leadership/robert-higgins

Living people
American thoracic surgeons
Johns Hopkins University faculty
African-American physicians
Year of birth missing (living people)
21st-century African-American people